St John on Bethnal Green is an early 19th-century church near Bethnal Green, London, and stands on the Green itself. It was constructed in 1826–1828 to the design of the architect Sir John Soane (1753–1837). It is an Anglican church in the Diocese of London. The church is near Bethnal Green tube station, on Bethnal Green Road and Roman Road. It is a Grade I listed building.

In 2000, the painter Chris Gollon gained a major commission from the Church of England for fourteen Stations of the Cross paintings for the church. Gollon was a controversial choice, since he is not a practising Christian. In order to carry out the commission, and for consultation on theological matters, he collaborated with Fr Alan Green, rector of the church.

The belfry provides an exhibition space for artists.

References

Churches completed in 1828
1828 establishments in England
19th-century Church of England church buildings
Bethnal Green
Diocese of London
Grade I listed churches in London
Grade I listed buildings in the London Borough of Tower Hamlets
John Soane buildings
Bethnal Green